The Mississippi Musicians Hall of Fame, headquartered in Clinton, Mississippi, honors Mississippi's famous musicians. It is a "Who's Who" of the blues, rock and roll, and jazz from their beginnings to present day.  The organization's museum is located in the Jackson–Evers International Airport in Jackson, Mississippi.

Inductees

Blues
 Willie Dixon - Vicksburg, MS 
 David "Honeyboy" Edwards - Shaw, MS
 Mississippi John Hurt - Teoc, MS 
 Vasti Jackson - McComb, MS
 Elmore James - Richland, MS
 Robert Johnson - Hazlehurst, MS
 Tommy Johnson - Terry, MS 
 B.B. King - Itta Bena, MS
 Charlie Musselwhite - Kosciusko, MS
 Charlie Patton - Edwards, MS
 Pinetop Perkins - Belzoni, MS
 Hubert Sumlin - Greenwood, MS
 Muddy Waters - Rolling Fork, MS
 Joseph Lee "Big Joe" Williams - Crawford, MS
 Sonny Boy Williamson II - Glendora, MS  
 Howlin Wolf - White Station, MS

Classical
 John Alexander - Meridian, MS 
 Milton Bryon Babbitt - Jackson, MS 
 William Brown - Jackson, MS
 Ruby Pearl Elzy - Pontotoc, MS
 Elizabeth Taylor Greenfield - Natchez, MS 
 Samuel Jones - Inverness, MS
 Willard Palmer - McComb, MS
 Leontyne Price - Laurel, MS
 Steve Rouse - Moss Point, MS
 James Sclater - Clinton, MS 
 William Grant Still - Woodville, MS 
 Walter Turnbull - Greenville, MS

Country
 Hank Cochran - Greenville, MS 
 Charles Feathers - Holly Springs, MS
 Bobbie Gentry - Chickasaw County, MS
 Mickey Gilley - Natchez, MS
 Faith Hill -  Ridgeland, MS 
 Carl Jackson - Louisville, MS
 Fred Knoblock - Jackson, MS 
 O. B. McCinton - Senatobia, MS 
 Elsie McWilliams - Meridian, MS 
 Ben Peters - Greenville, MS 
 Charley Pride - Sledge, MS 
 LeAnn Rimes - Pearl, MS
 Jimmie Rodgers - Meridian, MS 
 Mississippi Sheiks - Bolton, MS
 Conway Twitty - Friars Point, MS
 Tammy Wynette - Tremont, MS

Gospel and religious
 James Blackwood/The Blackwood Brothers - Ackerman, MS 
 Blind Boys of Mississippi - Piney Woods School 
 Canton Spirituals - Canton, MS 
 C. L. Franklin - Sunflower County, MS
 Mississippi Mass Choir/Frank D. Williams - Jackson, MS
 James Owens - Clarksdale, MS
 Pilgrim Jubilees - Houston, MS
 Rev. Cleophus Robinson, Canton, MS
 Jackson Southernaires - Jackson, MS 
 Pop Staples/Staples Singers - Winona, MS 
 Southern Sons - Delta, MS 
 Williams Brothers - Smithdale, MS

Jazz
 Mose Allison - Tallahatchie County, MS 
 Teddy Edwards - Jackson, MS
 William Fielder - Meridian, MS
 Dardanelle Hadley - Avalon, MS
 Milt Hinton - Vicksburg, MS 
 International Sweethearts of Rhythm - Piney Woods School 
 Hank Jones - Vicksburg, MS 
 Jimmie Lunceford - Fulton, MS
 Tom Malone - Sumrall, MS
 Brew Moore - Indianola, MS
 Dalton Smith - Jackson, MS
 Freddie Waits - Jackson, MS
 Cassandra Wilson - Jackson, MS 
 Gerald Stanley Wilson - Shelby, MS 
 Lester Young - Woodville, MS

Multi-talented
Marty Stuart - Philadelphia, MS

Popular music
 Lance Bass - Laurel/Clinton, MS
 Keith Carlock - Clinton, MS
 Paul Davis - Meridian, MS
 Guy Hovis - Tupelo, MS
 Van Dyke Parks - Hattiesburg, MS 
 Nanette Workman - Jackson, MS

Production/recording/promotion
 Blackberry Records - Summit, MS
 Delta Records/Jimmie Ammons - Jackson, MS
 Marty Gamblin - Philadelphia, MS 
 Malaco Records - Jackson, MS
 Willard and Lillian McMurry - Jackson, MS
 Peavey Electronics/Hartley Peavey - Meridian, MS
 H. C. Speir - Jackson, MS
 Johnny Vincent (John Imbragulio) - Laurel, MS
 Benjamin Wright - Greenville, MS
 Jim Dickinson - Little Rock, MS

Rap
 David Banner - Jackson, MS
Nate Dog - Clarksdale, Ms
Big K.R.I.T - Meridian, MS

Rhythm and blues
 Prentiss Barnes - Maglolia, MS
 Jerry Butler - Sunflower County, MS
 Joe Campbell - Greenville, MS 
 Little Milton Campbell - Inverness, MS
 Sam Cooke - Clarksdale, MS
 Tyrone Davis - Greenwood, MS
 Bo Diddley - McComb, MS
 John Lee Hooker - Clarksdale, MS 
 Dorothy Moore - Jackson, MS 
 Junior Parker - Clarksdale, MS 
 Jimmy Reed - Dunleith, MS
 David Ruffin - Meridian, MS
 Bobby Rush - Jackson, MS
 Rufus Thomas - Cayce, MS

Rock and roll
 Andy Anderson and the Rolling Stones - Clarksdale, MS,
 Jackie Brenston - Clarksdale, MS
 Delaney Bramlett - Pontotoc, MS
 Jimmy Buffett - Pascagoula, MS
 Ace Cannon - Grenada, MS
 Steve Forbert - Meridian, MS
 Blind Roosevelt Graves and the Mississippi Jook Band, Hattiesburg, MS
 Jerry Lee Lewis - Nesbit, MS 
 Elvis Presley - Tupelo, MS 
 Warren Smith - Louise, MS
 Fingers Taylor - Terry, MS
 Ike Turner - Clarksdale, MS
 Webb Wilder - Hattiesburg, MS 
 Mary Wilson - Greenville, MS

Theater/Broadway/movie
 Glen Ballard - Natchez, MS
 Dee Barton - Houston/Starkville, MS 
 Olu Dara - Natchez, MS 
 Lehman Engel - Jackson, MS 
 Eddie Hodges - Hattiesburg, MS
 Mundell Lowe - Laurel, MS 
 Mary Ann Mobley - Brandon, MS 
 Lloyd Wells - Laurel, MS

Songwriting
 William Alexander Attaway - Greesville, MS
 Mac McAnally - Belmont, MS
 Clyde Otis - Prentiss, MS
 Paul Overstreet - Van Cleave, MS
 Tommy Tate - Jackson, MS
 Jim Weatherly - Pontotoc, MS
 Craig Wiseman - Hattiesburg, MS

Special
 Bob Pittman - Brookhaven, MS
 Gayle Dean Wardlow - Meridian, MS
 Skeets McWilliams - Jackson, MS

See also
 List of music museums

References

External links
Mississippi Musicians Hall of Fame official website

Halls of fame in Mississippi
Music halls of fame
State halls of fame in the United States
Music museums in Mississippi
Tourist attractions in Rankin County, Mississippi
Lists of people from Mississippi
Lists of American musicians